The 1994 Cleveland Indians season was the 94th season for the franchise. For the first time since 1986, the Indians finished the season with a winning record. However, the 1994 season ended prematurely due to the 1994–95 Major League Baseball strike that ended the season on August 12. It was the first season for the Indians playing at Jacobs Field after playing at Cleveland Stadium since 1946.

Offseason
 November 2, 1993: Heathcliff Slocumb was traded by the Indians to the Philadelphia Phillies for Rubén Amaro Jr.
 December 2, 1993: Dennis Martínez was signed as a free agent by the Indians.
 December 13, 1993: Randy Milligan was traded by the Indians to the Montreal Expos for a player to be named later. The Expos completed the deal by sending Brian Barnes to the Indians on December 17.
 December 13, 1993: Sam Horn was released by the Indians.
 December 20, 1993: Félix Fermín was traded by the Cleveland Indians with Reggie Jefferson and cash to the Seattle Mariners for Omar Vizquel.
 February 10, 1994: Jack Morris was signed as a free agent by the Indians.
 March 30, 1994: Pete Rose Jr. was released by the Indians.

Regular season

On July 3, 1994, Larry Doby had his number retired by the team. Doby had played for Cleveland for ten seasons (1947–1955, 1958). He was the first African American to play in the American League, playing his first game in Major League Baseball on July 5, 1947, becoming the second African American player to play in MLB. A .287 hitter, Doby was an All-Star in two combined leagues (Negro League and American League) on seven occasions while winning a World Series in both leagues. Doby would later be inducted in the National Baseball Hall of Fame and Museum in 1998.

On July 15, 1994, Albert Belle's bat was confiscated by umpire Dave Phillips. It was the result of White Sox manager Gene Lamont believing that the bat was corked. During the game, Indians pitcher Jason Grimsley removed a ceiling tile in his manager's office and clambered on top of an  cinder block. He replaced the corked bat with a conventional bat but the bat had Paul Sorrento's name on it. Belle was suspended for seven games.

By Friday August 12, 1994, the Indians had compiled a 66-47 record through 113 games, just one game back of the Chicago White Sox for the AL Central Division lead. They had scored 679 runs (6.01 per game) and allowed 562 runs (4.97 per game). They were leading the AL Wildcard Race over the Baltimore Orioles by 2.5 games. Cleveland was leading the Majors in nearly every offensive category, including hits (1,165), runs scored (679), home runs (167), runs batted in (647), batting average (.290), slugging percentage (.484) and total bases (1,946).

Cleveland pitching was also strong, as Indians pitchers had combined for an MLB-high 17 complete games pitched before the players' strike prematurely ended the season.

Season standings

Record vs. opponents

Transactions
 April 3, 1994: Jeremy Hernandez was traded by the Indians to the Florida Marlins for Matt Turner.
 June 2, 1994: 1994 Major League Baseball draft
Jaret Wright was drafted by the Indians in the 1st round (10th pick). Player signed July 21, 1994.
Russell Branyan was drafted by the Indians in the 7th round. Player signed June 9, 1994.
Bruce Aven was drafted by the Indians in the 30th round of the 1994 amateur draft. Player signed June 4, 1994.
 July 26, 1994: Marco Scutaro was signed as an amateur free agent by the Cleveland Indians.
 August 9, 1994: Jack Morris was released by the Indians.
 August 31, 1994: Dave Winfield was purchased by the Indians from the Minnesota Twins.

Opening Day Lineup

Roster

Jacobs Field

In May 1990, Cuyahoga County voters approved a 15-year sin tax on alcohol and cigarette sales in order to finance the new sports complex.  In June 1992, the ceremonial first pitch was thrown at the site of the new Jacobs Field before construction of the building began.

In 1994, the ballpark opened under the name Jacobs Field as the new home of the Cleveland Indians, which had previously shared Cleveland Municipal Stadium with the NFL's Cleveland Browns. On April 4, 1994, the Indians played their first game at the new stadium.  President Bill Clinton threw out the ceremonial first pitch, and the Indians defeated the Seattle Mariners 4-3 in 11 innings.

Highlights

Player stats

Batting
Note: G = Games played; AB = At bats; R = Runs scored; H = Hits; 2B = Doubles; 3B = Triples; HR = Home runs; RBI = Runs batted in; AVG = Batting average; SB = Stolen bases

Pitching
Note: W = Wins; L = Losses; ERA = Earned run average; G = Games pitched; GS = Games started; SV = Saves; IP = Innings pitched; R = Runs allowed; ER = Earned runs allowed; BB = Walks allowed; K = Strikeouts

Awards and honors

All-Star Game

Minor league affiliates

References

1994 Cleveland Indians team at Baseball-Reference
1994 Cleveland Indians at Baseball Almanac

Cleveland Guardians seasons
Cleveland Indians season
Cleve